The third season of Designing Women premiered on CBS on November 14, 1988, and concluded on May 22, 1989. The season consisted of 22 episodes. Created by Linda Bloodworth-Thomason, the series was produced by Bloodworth/Thomason Mozark Productions in association with Columbia Pictures Television.

Cast

Main cast
 Dixie Carter as Julia Sugarbaker
 Annie Potts as Mary Jo Shively
 Delta Burke as Suzanne Sugarbaker
 Jean Smart as Charlene Frazier-Stillfield
 Meshach Taylor as Anthony Bouvier

Recurring cast
 Douglas Barr as Colonel Bill Stillfield
 Hal Holbrook as Reese Watson
 Richard Gilliland as J.D. Shackleford
 Alice Ghostley as Bernice Clifton
 Priscilla Weems as Claudia Shively

Guest cast

 Rika Hofmann as Ursula
 Robert Hy Gorman as Quinton Shively
 Jason Bernard as Wilson Brickett 
 Meg Wyllie as Dorothy
 Shavar Ross as Tyrone
 Ginna Carter as Camilla Sugarbaker
 Mary Dixie Carter as Jennifer Sugarbaker
 Tom Sullivan as Danny Hedgecock
 Gregory Wurster as Odell Frazier
 Sandy Kenyon as Bud Frazier
 Ken Letner as Earl Sloan 
 Leanne Griffin as Sissy Sloan
 Patrick Day as Ben
 Benay Venuta as Ellen Stillfield 
 Anne Haney as Aunt Phoebe Stillfield 

 William Bell Sullivan as Ken Rayburn
 Barry Corbin as Bud Frazier
 Ronnie Claire Edwards as Ione Frazier
 Bobbie Ferguson as Monette Marlin
 Phyllis Cowan as Darlene Frazier
 Justin Burnette as Harold Thomas Frazier
 Deborah Benson as Harlene Frazier
 Fabiana Udenio as Juanita
 Ian Patrick Williams as DeWitt Chiles
 Wendie Jo Sperber as Estelle Rinehart
 Millicent Collingsworth as Gail Forrester
 Buddy Farmer as D.B. LeBoot
 Danny Thomason as Reggie Mac Dawson 
 Macon McCalman as Paul Webster
 Rosalind Ingledew as Terry Wilder

Episodes

DVD release
The third season was released on DVD by Shout! Factory on March 22, 2010.

References

External links
 

Designing Women seasons
1988 American television seasons
1989 American television seasons